Randolph Toussaint (born 12 August 1955) is a Guyanese former cyclist. He competed in the individual road race event at the 1984 Summer Olympics.

References

External links
 

1955 births
Living people
Guyanese male cyclists
Olympic cyclists of Guyana
Cyclists at the 1984 Summer Olympics
Place of birth missing (living people)